Neffs is an unincorporated community and census-designated place in northwestern Pultney Township, Belmont County, Ohio, United States. The population was 878 at the 2020 census. It is part of the Wheeling metropolitan area.

History
A post office called Neffs has been in operation since 1892. Besides the post office, Neffs had a sawmill and gristmill. The local Neffs (or Neife) family came to Belmont County from Switzerland via Pennsylvania and Maryland.

On March 16, 1940, at approximately 11:00am EST, an explosion at Hanna Coal Company's No. 10 Mine at Willow Grove occurred, killing 72 men.

Neffs was also the birthplace of model and actor Ken Clark.

Geography
Neffs is located in eastern Belmont County at  (40.028736, -80.815811), in the northwest part of Pultney Township. The center of the community lies in the valley of McMahon Creek, a tributary of the Ohio River. Ohio State Route 149 passes through Neffs, leading east  to Bellaire on the Ohio. Downtown Wheeling, West Virginia, is an additional five miles to the north from Bellaire.

Demographics

As of the census of 2000, there were 1,138 people, 449 households, and 339 families residing in the CDP. The population density was 283.8 people per square mile (109.6/km2). There were 483 housing units at an average density of 120.4/sq mi (46.5/km2). The racial makeup of the community was 99.03% White, 0.35% African American, and 0.62% from two or more races. Hispanic or Latino of any race were 0.18% of the population.

There were 449 households, out of which 29.0% had children under the age of 18 living with them, 58.1% were married couples living together, 10.2% had a female householder with no husband present, and 24.3% were non-families. 21.4% of all households were made up of individuals, and 10.7% had someone living alone who was 65 years of age or older. The average household size was 2.53 and the average family size was 2.93.

In the CDP the population was spread out, with 21.8% under the age of 18, 7.7% from 18 to 24, 28.3% from 25 to 44, 26.5% from 45 to 64, and 15.6% who were 65 years of age or older. The median age was 40 years. For every 100 females there were 98.6 males. For every 100 females age 18 and over, there were 94.3 males.

The median income for a household in the CDP was $25,000, and the median income for a family was $36,875. Males had a median income of $31,875 versus $19,926 for females. The per capita income for the community was $13,557. About 7.7% of families and 13.8% of the population were below the poverty line, including 22.6% of those under age 18 and 6.9% of those age 65 or over.

References

External links
 List of casualties on March 16, 1940

Populated places established in 1797
Census-designated places in Belmont County, Ohio
1892 establishments in Ohio
Populated places established in 1892